Dosti (English translation: "friendship") is the second compilation album and seventh overall album of the Pakistani rock band, Junoon. The album was released by Virgin Records India in 1998 and was produced by Brian O'Connell and Salman Ahmad. The album includes famous singles such as "Dosti", "Husan Walo", "Neend Athi Nahin" and "Chalay Thay Saath".

Track listing
All music written and composed by Salman Ahmad and Sabir Zafar.

Personnel
All information is taken from the CD.

Junoon
Salman Ahmad - lead vocals and guitar
Ali Azmat - backing vocals
Brian O'Connell - bass guitar and backing vocals
Malcom Goveas - drums
Ashiq Ali Mir - percussion

Production
Produced by Brian O'Connell & Salman Ahmad

References

Junoon (band) compilation albums
1998 compilation albums
Urdu-language albums